John Archibald Cameron (December 3, 1900 – November 29, 1981) was a Canadian ice hockey goaltender who competed in the 1924 Winter Olympics.

Career
Cameron was a member of the Toronto Granites team that won a gold medal for Canada in ice hockey at the 1924 Winter Olympics.

In recognition of Cameron's role in international hockey for Canada in 1924, 50 years later he participated in the post-game award ceremony following game #1 of the 1974 Summit Series in Quebec City. He presented the game's MVP awards to Bobby Hull (Canada) and Valeri Kharlamov (Soviet Union).

Career statistics

International

References

External links
 

1902 births
1981 deaths
Canadian ice hockey goaltenders
Ice hockey players at the 1924 Winter Olympics
Medalists at the 1924 Winter Olympics
Olympic gold medalists for Canada
Olympic ice hockey players of Canada
Olympic medalists in ice hockey